The Transition Matrix Method (T-matrix method, TMM) is a computational technique of light scattering by nonspherical particles originally formulated by Peter C. Waterman (1928–2012) in 1965.
The technique is also known as null field method and extended boundary condition method (EBCM). In the method, matrix elements are obtained by matching boundary conditions for solutions of Maxwell equations. It has been greatly extended to incorporate diverse types of linear media occupying the region enclosing the scatterer.
T-matrix method proves to be highly efficient and has been widely-used in computing electromagnetic scattering of single and compound particles.

Definition of the T-matrix 

The incident and scattered electric field are expanded into spherical vector wave functions (SVWF), which are also encountered in Mie scattering. They are the fundamental solutions of the vector Helmholtz equation and
can be generated from the scalar fundamental solutions in spherical coordinates, the spherical Bessel functions of the first kind and the spherical Hankel functions. Accordingly, there are two linearly independent sets of solutions
They are also called regular and outgoing SVWFs, respectively. With this, we can write the incident field as

The scattered field is expanded into radiating SVWFs:

The T-matrix relates the expansion coefficients of the incident field to those of the scattered field. 

The T-matrix is determined by the scatterer shape and material and for a given incident field allows one to calculate the scattered field.

Calculation of the T-matrix 

The standard way to calculate the T-matrix is the null-field method, which relies on the Stratton–Chu equations. They basically state that the electromagnetic fields outside a given volume can be expressed as integrals over the surface enclosing the volume involving only the tangential components of the fields on the surface. If the observation point is located inside this volume, the integrals vanish.

By making use of the boundary conditions for the tangential field components on the scatterer surface,

and
,

where  is the normal vector to the scatterer surface, one can derive an integral representation of the scattered field in terms of the tangential components of the internal fields on the scatterer surface. A similar representation can be derived for the incident field.

By expanding the internal field in terms of SVWFs and exploiting their orthogonality on spherical surfaces, one arrives at an expression for the T-matrix. The T-matrix can also be computed from far field data. This approach avoids numerical stability issues associated with the null-field method. 

Several numerical codes for the evaluation of the T-matrix can be found online   .

The T matrix can be found with methods other than null field method and extended boundary condition method (EBCM); therefore,
the term ``T-matrix method" is infelicitous.

References 

Computational physics
Electromagnetism
Electrodynamics
Scattering, absorption and radiative transfer (optics)
Computational electromagnetics